The 2022 United States Mixed Doubles Curling Championship was held from March 8 to 13, 2022 at Bob Suter's Capitol Ice Arena in Middleton, Wisconsin. The championship featured twenty-five teams that played in a triple knockout format, which qualified eight teams for the championship round. From there, four teams advanced to the four team page playoff round.

The winning team, Becca and Matt Hamilton, represented the United States at the 2022 World Mixed Doubles Curling Championship in Geneva, Switzerland.

Teams
The teams competing in the 2022 championship were:

Knockout brackets

Source:

A event

B event

C event

Knockout results
All draw times listed in Central Time (UTC-06:00).

Draw 1
Tuesday, March 8, 9:00 am

Draw 2
Tuesday, March 8, 12:30 pm

Draw 3
Tuesday, March 8, 4:00 pm

Draw 4
Tuesday, March 8, 7:30 pm

Draw 5
Wednesday, March 9, 9:00 am

Draw 6
Wednesday, March 9, 12:30 pm

Draw 7
Wednesday, March 9, 4:00 pm

Draw 8
Wednesday, March 9, 7:30 pm

Draw 9
Thursday, March 10, 10:00 am

Draw 10
Thursday, March 10, 1:00 pm

Draw 11
Thursday, March 10, 4:00 pm

Draw 12
Thursday, March 10, 7:30 pm

Draw 13
Friday, March 11, 11:00 am

Draw 14
Friday, March 11, 3:00 pm

Championship round

Draw 15
Friday, March 11, 7:00 pm

Draw 16
Saturday, March 12, 11:00 am

Playoffs

1 vs. 2
Saturday, March 12, 3:00 pm

3 vs. 4
Saturday, March 12, 3:00 pm

Semifinal
Saturday, March 12, 7:00 pm

Final
Sunday, March 13, 11:00 am

References

United States National Curling Championships
Curling in Wisconsin
United States Mixed Doubles Curling Championship
2022 in sports in Wisconsin
Curling
United States 2022